Takhemaret is a town and commune in Tiaret Province in north-western Algeria, about 65 km. southwest of the city of Tiaret.  The 2008 census population was 34,124 in the commune, with 20,827 in the city. 

During Roman empire it was named Cohors Breucorum, a "castrum" (fort) near the Roman limes in Mauretania Caesariensis.

References

See also
 Cohors Breucorum

Communes of Tiaret Province
Cities in Algeria
Algeria